Class 25 may refer to:

 Express train, steam locomotives with a 2-8-0 wheel arrangement operated by the Deutsche Reichsbahn in the GDR after World War II:
 The new, post-war locomotive (Neubaulokomotive): DR Class 25.0
 The trials locomotives: DR Class 25.10
 The electric multiple units of DRG Class ET 25, later DB Class 425, built for the Deutsche Reichsbahn in the 1930s.